Humberto Barbosa Tozzi (4 February 1934 – 17 April 1980) was a Brazilian international footballer who played for São Cristóvão, Palmeiras, Lazio and Fluminense. Tozzi represented Brazil at the 1952 Summer Olympics and the 1954 FIFA World Cup.

References

External links

Museu dos Esportes

Profile at Enciclopediadelcalcio

1934 births
1980 deaths
Brazilian footballers
Brazil international footballers
Footballers at the 1952 Summer Olympics
Olympic footballers of Brazil
1954 FIFA World Cup players
Sociedade Esportiva Palmeiras players
S.S. Lazio players
Fluminense FC players
Brazilian expatriate footballers
Expatriate footballers in Italy
Serie A players
People from São João de Meriti
Association football forwards
Sportspeople from Rio de Janeiro (state)